Skyplex was a proposed and planned entertainment complex,  It would be located on a  lot at the northeast corner of Sand Lake Road and International Drive in Orlando, Florida. Plans for the complex include a  tower which would feature the world's tallest roller coaster, Skyscraper, and the world's largest Perkins Restaurant and Bakery. In January 2019 the project was expected to cost  and include space for a future hotel. The complex was originally planned to open in 2020. However, construction on the project has not begun, and it is uncertain if the complex would be built. However, on December 21 2022, US Thrill Rides and Polercoaster, LLC filed for Chapter 11 bankruptcy. On January 30, 2023, WPC (Winter Park Construction) confirmed that the project would not be moving forward.

History
The project began in 2012 with a planned budget of US$500,000,000. After several successful land negotiations conducted under the name WF IDrive Realty, development of Skyplex and the roller coaster began.

The complex was designed by Helman Hurley Charvat Peacock/Architects Inc. In May 2014, a website seeking investors was published.

In 2015, Wallack Holdings LLC spent  to develop a retail complex, a parking garage, and a Mango's Tropical Cafe on the southwest corner of the same intersection as Skyplex.

On December 1, 2015, the Orange County Board of Commissioners unanimously approved the project's rezoning. The project was lobbied against by Save Our Orange County Community, a group backed primarily by Universal Orlando.

Portions of the roller coaster's track had been completed by Intamin and were in storage by April 2017, but the start of construction in Orlando was on hold pending the approval of permits.

The project was later removed from Mango's Tropical Cafe's website in June 2019. In 2021, Joshuah Wallack revealed that Wallack Holdings had signed a licensing deal with Lionsgate Entertainment to open Skyplex as a Lionsgate Entertainment World resort, but that the project had lost its financing in early 2020 as theme parks in Florida were being forced to closed due to the COVID-19 pandemic. Wallack Holdings still held the licensing deal and Joshua Wallack said that while he still believed in the Skyplex concept, practical considerations had him considering other uses for the site such as a resort hotel to support the nearby upcoming Universal's Epic Universe theme park. On December 21, 2022, Polercoaster LLC and US Thrill Rides the companies behind the project filed for Chapter 11 bankruptcy. On January 30, 2023, WPC (Winter Park Construction) confirmed that the project would not be moving forward.

Planned attractions

Development of Skyscraper began in 2012 after the Polercoaster concept from US Thrill Rides was selected as an attraction for the new complex. Skyscraper was officially announced on June 5, 2014. In February 2015, it was announced that a drop thrill ride called SkyFall would be incorporated into the design of Skyscraper.

An adult game room would feature party rooms, a central bar, billiards, video games, and simulators. The family game area would feature traditional games, electronic games, and simulators.

The Apex Sports Bar would include private party rooms, VIP seating, a tequila bar, and large screen theatre style viewing of sports programs.

There would be an open-air retail area promenade, SkyPlaza, with a raised pedestrian walkway leading to the main entrance. SkyPlaza would be anchored by a  Perkins Restaurant and Bakery, which would be the largest in the world. The promenade would’ve include several other retail and restaurant tenants.

References

Buildings and structures in Orlando, Florida
Tourist attractions in Orlando, Florida
Proposed skyscrapers in the United States
Companies that filed for Chapter 11 bankruptcy in 2022